"Rude Mood" is the sixth track on Stevie Ray Vaughan's debut album, Texas Flood. It is a blues shuffle instrumental in 4/4 (common time) and played at 264 beats per minute.

The song was nominated for the Grammy Award for Best Rock Instrumental Performance in 1984 but lost to Sting's "Brimstone and Treacle".

Origin and structure 
"Rude Mood" is a take-off of a Lightnin' Hopkins song called "Hopkins' Sky Hop". Vaughan played this song in several live performances including Live at Carnegie Hall and can be seen on the DVD Live at Montreux 1982. There are also versions where he uses an acoustic guitar instead of his characteristic Stratocaster, while sometimes also taking it notably faster or slower than the recorded studio version.

The song starts out with the main riff introduced by the guitar; the bass notes are played quickly with muted notes in between, resulting in a swung feel. The bass guitar and drums are introduced after the introduction, establishing the beat that continues to the end. The song can be broken up into many sections, separated by each 12-bar blues progression, with most sections ending in the same fashion as the beginning riff.

References

Stevie Ray Vaughan songs
1983 songs
Songs written by Stevie Ray Vaughan